Julien Faussurier (born 14 January 1987) is a French professional footballer who plays as a defender for  club Sochaux.

Career
Faussurier was born in Lyon, France. He signed for then Ligue 2 side Troyes AC in the summer of 2008 from Olympique Lyonnais. He stayed with Troyes for a spell of five years and in June 2013, agreed to a four-year deal with the Ligue 1 outfit Sochaux. In July 2016, he signed a two-years contract at Stade Brestois 29 (Ligue 2).

On 19 July 2022, Faussurier returned to Sochaux. He signed a contract for one season with an option for a second season.

Career statistics

Club

References

External links
 
 

1987 births
Living people
Association football defenders
French footballers
ES Troyes AC players
FC Sochaux-Montbéliard players
Stade Brestois 29 players
Ligue 2 players
Championnat National players
Ligue 1 players